Bojan Živanović (born 27 June 1989, in Smederevo) is a Serbian football defender who plays for FK Smederevo in the Serbian SuperLiga.

References

1989 births
Living people
Serbian footballers
FK Smederevo players
Association football defenders